On May 21, 1995, regional elections were held in Belgium, to choose representatives in the regional councils of Flanders, Wallonia, Brussels and the German-speaking Community of Belgium. It also was the first time elections were held for the Flemish and the Walloon Council. The regional elections were held on the same day as the federal election.

Flemish Parliament

Following this first direct election of the Flemish Parliament, the Christian democrats (CVP) and the Socialist Party (SP) formed a Flemish Government led by Minister-President Luc Van den Brande (CVP).

By constituency

Walloon Regional Parliament

Brussels Regional Parliament

Council of the German-speaking Community

1995
1995 elections in Belgium
May 1995 events in Europe